During the Bangladesh War of Independence, the Bangladesh Forces (not to be confused with Mukti Bahini) were divided in the geographical area of Bangladesh into eleven divisions designated as sectors. Each sector had a sector commander I.e. Division Commanders who directed the military operation further coordinated through several sub-sectors under sub-sector commanders who fought along with their troops and civilian resistance fighters. Most of the Sector Commanders and quite a number of sub-sector commanders remained in security under Indian BSF border camps such as Wing Commander Bashar, Major Shafiullah, Major Mir Shawkat Ali.

History

Bangladesh Sector Commanders Conference
The history of the Bangladesh war of Independence dates back to April 1971 when it began its inception with the title of Bangladesh Forces during the first Bangladesh Sector Commanders Conference held in the week of July 11–17, 1971. It was at this conference during which time BD Forces was organized and formed for the independence struggle. It was significant in the light of its official creation and formation as Bangladesh Forces, its command structuring, sector reorganization, reinforcement and appointing war commanders were its principal focus.

This conference was presided over by the Prime Minister of Bangladesh, Tajuddin Ahmed, and Colonel  M.A.G. Osmani, during which General Muhammad Ataul Gani Osmani was reinstated from retirement to active duty into the Bangladesh  Forces as its senior most official. Colonel M.A.G. Osmani had thereby been appointed Commander in Chief of all Bangladesh Forces with Lt. Col M. A. Rab as Chief of Army Staff. Principal participants of this conference was Squadron Leader M. Hamidullah Khan, Major Ziaur Rahman, Wing Commander M Khademul Bashar, Major M. A. Jalil, Captain Haider, Lt. Col. M A Rab.

Structure
The Bangladesh Forces was organized for the war in 1971 into in 11 divisions (sectors) and later 3 indep brigades were christened, under BDF HQ situated at 8 Theatre Road, Calcutta, West Bengal. Bangladesh interim provincial government of July 11, 1971 appointed Col. M A G Osmani as Commander in Chief. Lt. Col Rab was appointed as Chief of Bangladesh Army Staff. In this meeting, Bangladesh was divided into Eleven Divisions (Sectors) under BDF Commanders.

BDF Commanders of the sectors directed the guerrilla warfare. For better efficiency in military operations each of the BFF sectors were divided into a number of sub-sectors. On November 21, 1971 Bangladesh Forces under Indian Army formed an allied command in which India took surrender of Pakistani forces on December 16, 1971. The table below provides a list of the BDF sectors along with the area under each of them, the names of the BDF commanders of 11 sectors and sub-sectors.

The 10th BDF Sector was directly placed under Commander in Chief and included the Naval Commandos and C-in-C's special force. These commandos were later absorbed into the Bangladesh Navy. BDF Commanders directed the guerrilla warfare against West Pakistani forces.

Indian participation
The Bangladesh Forces (BDF) received assistance from the Indian authorities soon after hostilities started. On November 21, 1971, The Indian Army entered Bangladesh through air and land. The Pakistani forces morally broken and militarily devastated by the BD Forces, agreed to a cease fire without defiance in about one and a half weeks, on December 16, 1971.

The cease fire was switched to a surrender document by the Indian government which the Commanding General of the Pakistan Army Eastern Command signed reluctantly. Victory was declared by the Indian authorities and all prisoners of war including combat material were taken to India. Bangladesh Forces were ordered for complete sector close down and demobilization on January 29 by end of March 1972 under the direction of General M.A.G Osmani in final Sector Commanders Conference held at the old Police HQ at 27 Old Mintu Road, Dhaka. All BDF sector Commanders along with C-in-C BDF Gen. M.A.G. Osmani transferred from their posts to respective services. The first government of Bangladesh was formed on 10 April 1971.They took an oath on 17 April 1971.

List of sectors and subsectors

List of Brigade Formations
 Z Force, commanded by Lt. Col. Ziaur Rahman, consisted of 1, 3 and 8 East Bengal Regiment.
 Brigade Major - Captain Oli Ahmad
 D-Q Officer – Captain Sadeque
 Brigade Medical Officer - Dr. H K M Abdul Hye
 1st East Bengal Regiment – CO – Major Mohammad Ziauddin. 1st East Bengal Regiment's Senior Officer Major Ziauddin was appointed as CO on 12 August 1971 after the operational attack on Pakistan Army BOP at Kamalpur took place on 31 July 1971 under BDF Sector 11.
 - Battalion Adjutant/Quartermaster: Flight Lieutenant Liaqat Ali Khan
 'Alpha' Company Commander: Captain Mahbubur Rahman
 'Bravo' Company Commander: Captain Hafiz Uddin Ahmad
 'Charlie' Company Commander: Captain Salauddin Mumtaz
 Acting Company Commander – Second Lieutenant Anisur Rahman
 Acting Platoon Commander – Second Lieutenant Wakar Hassan
 3rd East Bengal Regiment – CO : Major Shafaat Jamil.
 - 2IC: Captain Mohsin Uddin Ahmad
 - Battalion Adjutant: Flight Lieutenant Ashraful Alam
 - RMO: Dr Wasi Uddin
 - Acting Company Commander: Second Lieutenant Fazle Hossain
 - Company Officer: Flight Lieutenant Ashraful Alam
 - Platoon Commander: Second Lieutenant Manzur Ahmad
 'Alpha' Company: Captain Anwar Hossain
 'Bravo' Company: Captain Akbar Hossain
 'Charlie' Company: Captain Mohsin Uddin Ahmad
 8th East Bengal Regiment – CO: Major Abu Zafar Muhammad Aminul Haque
 - 2IC: Captain Khaleq Uz Zaman Chowdhury
 - RMO: Dr Belayet Hossain
 - Acting Company Commander: Second Lieutenant Emdadul Haq
 - Company Officer: Second Lieutenant Munibur Rahman
 - Platoon Commander: Second Lieutenant Abu Zafar
 'Alpha' Company: Captain Khaleq Uz Zaman Chowdhury
 'Bravo' Company: Captain Sadeq Hossain
 'Charlie' Company: Lieutenant Modasser Hossain
 'Delta' Company: Lieutenant Mahbubur Rahman
 2nd Field Artillery Battery (Rawshanara Battery) – CO: Major Khandkar Abdur Rashid. During mid-September six 105 mm Howitzers were delivered at Assam's Masimpur district from India's Echo sector. Primarily with these six artillery pieces the 2nd FA battery was formed at Koishal, India, opposite Sylhet border area. From 10, 2 October FA battery assisted Z Force in the Sylhet sector in direct fire support and ground operations during multiple missions against Pakistan army strongholds.
 - Battery Adjutant: Captain A. M. Rashed Chowdhury
 - Battery Officer: Second Lieutenant Kazi Sazzad Ali Zahir
 No. 1 Signal Company – Unit formed on 5 September 1971, CO: Captain Abdul Halim. Since October the First Signal Company of Bangladesh Forces was assigned to Z Force's 8th East Bengal Regiment and participated in every single mission. Notably in the Sylhet zone 4th and 5th Sector's Borolekha, Fultola, Adamtila, Biyani Bazar operations.
 K Force, commanded by Lt. Col. Khaled Mosharraf, was created in September with 4, 9 and 10 East Bengal Regiment.
 4th East Bengal Regiment - Commanding Officer - Captain M.A. Gaffar Haldar
 9th East Bengal Regiment - Commanding Officer -  Captain Muhammad Ainuddin
 10th East Bengal Regiment - Commanding Officer - Major Abdus Saleq Chowdhury (14 October-23 October) and Captain Zafar Imam (24 October-16 December)
 1st Field Artillery Battery - Commanding Officer – Captain Abdul Aziz Pasha
 S Force, with Major K.M. Safiullah, was created in October 1971 and consisted of 2 and 11 East Bengal Regiment.
 2nd East Bengal Regiment - Commanding Officer - Major Moinul Hossain Chowdhury
 11th East Bengal Regiment - Commanding Officer - Major Abu Saleh Mohammad Nasim

References

Bangladesh Liberation War
Military history of Bangladesh
Mukti Bahini